This page lists Japan-related articles with romanized titles beginning with the letter T. For names of people, please list by surname (i.e., "Tarō Yamada" should be listed under "Y", not "T"). Please also ignore articles (e.g. "a", "an", "the") when listing articles (i.e., "A City with No People" should be listed under "City").

Ta
Tabi
Tabuse, Yamaguchi
Tachi
Tachiarai, Fukuoka
Tachibana, Fukuoka
Tachibana, Yamaguchi
Tachihara Michizō
Tachikawa, Tokyo
Tadao Ando
Tadaoka, Osaka
Tado, Mie
Tadotsu, Kagawa
Taga, Shiga
Taga Takatada
Tagajō, Miyagi
Tagata District, Shizuoka
Tagawa District, Fukuoka
Tagawa Matsu
Tagawa, Fukuoka
Taguchi methods
Tahara, Aichi
Taihei, Fukuoka
Taiji, Wakayama
Taijutsu
Taiko
The Tale of Genji
The Tale of Genji (manga)
The Tales of Ise
Taima, Nara
Taimei, Kumamoto
Taira clan
Taira no Kiyomori
Tairō
Taisha, Shimane
Taishi, Hyōgo
Taishi, Osaka
Taishō period
Taishō, Kōchi
Taito Corporation
Taitō, Tokyo
Taiyaki
Taiyō o Nusunda Otoko
Tajima Province
Tajimi, Gifu
Tajiri, Osaka
Satoshi Tajiri
Yoshihiro Tajiri
Tak Matsumoto
Taka District, Hyōgo
Takachiho, Miyazaki
Takahagi, Ibaraki
Takahama, Aichi
Takaharu, Miyazaki
Takahashi, Okayama
Takahashi Korekiyo
Yuji Takahashi
Isao Takahata
Takaichi District, Nara
Takaishi
Takajo, Miyazaki
Takamatsu, Kagawa
Takamine Jōkichi
Takamori, Kumamoto
Takanabe, Miyazaki
Takane, Gifu
Tsugi Takano
Takano, Hiroshima
Takanohana Kōji
Takaoka, Toyama
Takaoka District, Kōchi
Takaoka, Miyazaki
Takaono, Kagoshima
Takarabe, Kagoshima
Takarazuka, Hyōgo
Takarazuka Revue
Takasago, Hyōgo
Takasago International Corporation
Takasaki, Gunma
Takase, Kagawa
Takashi Miike
Takashi Yanase
Takashima District, Shiga
Takashima, Shiga
Takasugi Shinsaku
Takatori, Nara
Takatsuki, Osaka
Takatsuki, Shiga
Takayama, Gifu
Minami Takayama
Takazaki, Miyazaki
Takebe, Okayama
Takeda
Takeda Awards
Takeda Pharmaceutical Company
Takeda Shingen
Takeda Katsuyori
Takefu, Fukui
Takehara, Hiroshima
Hiroyuki Takei
Tōru Takemitsu
Nobukazu Takemura
Takenaka Corporation
Takeno, Hyōgo
Takeo Kanade
Takeo, Saga
Takeru Kobayashi
Takeshi's Castle
Noboru Takeshita
Takeshita Street
Taketa, Ōita
Taketomi, Okinawa
Taketoyo, Aichi
Mariya Takeuchi
Naoko Takeuchi
Yūko Takeuchi
Taki District, Mie
Rentaro Taki
Taki, Mie
Taki, Shimane
Takikawa, Hokkaidō
Takino, Hyōgo
Tako hiki
Takoyaki
Takoyaki pan
Taku, Saga
Takuan Sōhō
Takuma, Kagawa
The Tale of Genji
The Tale of the Heike
Tales of Phantasia
Tama, Tokyo
Tama-chan
Tama Hills
Tama New Town
Tama River
Tama Toshi Monorail Line
Tamachi Station
Tamagawa, Ehime
Tamagawa, Yamaguchi
Tamagotchi
Tamagusuku, Okinawa
Tamakeri
Tamaki, Mie
Nami Tamaki
Makoto Tamamura
Tamana District, Kumamoto
Tamana, Kumamoto
Tamano, Okayama
Tamasay
Tamayu, Shimane
Tetsuro Tamba
Tampopo
Tanabata
Tanabe, Wakayama
Tanba Province
Takata, Fukuoka
Tanaka Giichi
Tanaka Hidemitsu
Hirokazu Tanaka
Kakuei Tanaka
Kinuyo Tanaka
Makiko Tanaka
Tanaka Memorial
Yoshiki Tanaka
Yōjirō Takita
Tanba, Kyoto
Tanbara, Ehime
Miyuki Tanobe
Taneda Santoka
Tanegashima
Taneichi, Iwate
Yutaka Taniyama
Kenzo Tange
Tango Province
Tanigumi, Gifu
Junichirō Tanizaki
Tanizaki Prize
Tanka (poetry)
Tankan
Tano, Kōchi
Tano, Miyazaki
Tanoura, Kumamoto
Tantō
Tantō, Hyōgo
Tantojutsu
Tanuma Okitsugu
Tanushimaru, Fukuoka
Tara, Saga
Taragi, Kumamoto
Tarama, Okinawa
Tarui, Gifu
Tarumizu, Kagoshima
Tashiro, Kagoshima
Masashi Tashiro
Tatami
Tatebayashi, Gunma
Tatenokai
Tateyama, Chiba
Tatsugō, Kagoshima
Tatsumi
Tatsuno, Hyōgo
Tatsuta, Aichi
Tatsuya Uemura
Tatsuyama, Shizuoka
Tawaramoto, Nara

Td
TDK

Te
Tea house
Team Rocket
Technics (brand)
Technos Japan Corporation
Teichiku Records
Teiji Takagi
Teikei
Teikoku Bungaku
Teinosuke Kinugasa
Tekken
Temma Station
Tempura
Ten thousand years
Tenchi Muyo!
Tendai
Tendō, Yamagata
Tendō Station
Tengu
Tenkawa, Nara
Akito Tenkawa
Tennen Rishin-ryū
Tennin
Tennōji-ku, Osaka
Tenri, Nara
Tenri-O-no-Mikoto
Tenrikyo
Tenseiga
Tenshi Nanka Ja Nai
Tenshin Shōden Katori Shintō-ryū
Tenshinhan
Tensoba
Tensui, Kumamoto
Tentacle rape
Tentsuyu
Teppanyaki
Terada Torahiko
Susumu Terajima
Hisaichi Terauchi
Terauchi Masatake
Teriyaki
Terry Bogard
Hiroshi Teshigahara
Tetsusaiga
Tessei, Okayama
Tetraodontidae
Tetta, Okayama
Osamu Tezuka

Th
ThinkPad
Throne of Blood
Three great nobles

To
Toad (Nintendo)
Toaplan
Toba, Mie
Tobal No. 1
Tobe, Ehime
Tobishima, Aichi
Tochigi, Tochigi
Tochigi Prefecture
Tochio, Niigata
Toda Kazuaki
Toda, Saitama
Tōdai-ji
Tōei, Aichi
Tofu
Togakure Ryu
Togane, Chiba
Tōgō Heihachirō
Togo, Miyazaki
Togo, Tottori
Togouchi, Hiroshima
Tohaku District, Tottori
Tōhaku, Tottori
To Heart
Toho
Tōhoku Main Line
Tōhoku region
Tōhoku Shinkansen
Tohoku University
Toi invasion
Toin, Mie
Hideki Tojo
Tōjō, Hiroshima
Tōjō, Hyōgo
Tokachi Subprefecture
Tōkai region
Tōkaidō
Tōkaidō Main Line
Tōkaidō Shinkansen
Tōkamachi, Niigata
Tokashiki, Okinawa
Toki, Gifu
Toki District, Gifu
Toki Susumu
Tokio (band)
Tokio Marine & Fire Insurance Co.
Tokomaro
Tokoname, Aichi
Tokorozawa, Saitama
Shusei Tokuda
Tokugawa Hidetada
Tokugawa Ieharu
Tokugawa Iemitsu
Tokugawa Iemochi
Tokugawa Ienari
Tokugawa Ienobu
Tokugawa Iesada
Tokugawa Ieshige
Tokugawa Ietsugu
Tokugawa Ietsuna
Tokugawa Ieyasu
Tokugawa Ieyoshi
Tokugawa Mitsukuni
Tokugawa Nariaki
Tokugawa Tsunayoshi
Tokugawa Yorifusa
Tokugawa Yorinobu
Tokugawa Yoshimune
Tokugawa Yoshinao
Tokugawa Yoshinobu
Tokugawa shogunate
Tokuji, Yamaguchi
Tokunoshima, Kagoshima
Tokushima Prefecture
Tokushima, Tokushima
Tokuso
Tokutei Asia
Tokyo
Tokyo Bay
Tokyo Broadcasting System
Tokyo City
Tokyo Decadence
Tokyo Disney Resort
Tokyo DisneySea
Tokyo Express
Tokyo Institute of Technology
Tokyo International Airport
Tokyo Kyuko Electric Railway
Tokyo Metro
Tokyo Metro Chiyoda Line
Tokyo Metro Ginza Line
Tokyo Metro Tōzai Line
Tokyo Metropolitan Bureau of Transportation
Tokyo Metropolitan University
Tokyo Monorail
Tokyo Rose
Tokyo Shimbun
Tokyo Shock Boys
Tokyo Ska Paradise Orchestra
Tokyo Station
Tokyo Stock Exchange
Tokyo Subway
Tokyo Tower
Tokyu Toyoko Line
Tokyo Verdy 1969
Tokyo Waterfront Area Rapid Transit
Tokyo Yakult Swallows
Tomakomai, Hokkaidō
Tomari, Tottori
Tomata District, Okayama
Tomi, Okayama
Tomiai, Kumamoto
Tomigusuku, Okinawa
Tomigusuku Castle, Okinawa
Tomika, Gifu
Sin-Itiro Tomonaga
Yoshiyuki Tomino
Tomioka, Gunma
Tomioka Makoto
Tomisato, Chiba
Isao Tomita
Tomiyama, Aichi
Tomochi, Kumamoto
Hotaru Tomoe
Tonaki, Okinawa
Tonami, Toyama
Tonbara, Shimane
Tondabayashi, Osaka
Tondemo
Tongzhou Incident
Tonkatsu
Tōnō
Tōno, Iwate
Tonoshō, Kagawa
Tōon, Ehime
Topix
Tora! Tora! Tora!
Torahime, Shiga
Tori Busshi
Toride, Ibaraki
Torii
Torii Naritsugu
Torii Tadaharu
Torii Tadamasa
Torii Tadatsune
Torii Tadayoshi
Akira Toriyama
Tornado Mart
Tosa District, Kōchi
Tosa Province
Tosa, Kōchi
Tosa, Kōchi (Tosa)
Tosashimizu, Kōchi
Tosayama, Kōchi
Tosayamada, Kōchi
Toshiba
Toshima, Kagoshima
Toshima, Tokyo (ward)
Toshirō Mifune
Toshiro Tsuchida
Tosu, Saga
Tōtōmi Province
Tōtōsai
Totsukawa, Nara
Tottori, Tottori
Tottori Prefecture
Tottori Sand Dunes
Touch (manga)
Tōkijin
Towa, Kōchi
Tōwa, Yamaguchi
Towada, Aomori
Towns of Japan
Toyama, Toyama
Toyama Airport
Toyama Prefecture
Toyo Province
Tōyō Bunko
Tōyo, Ehime
Tōyō, Kumamoto
Toyoake, Aichi
Eiji Toyoda
Soemu Toyoda
Toyohama, Hiroshima
Toyohama, Kagawa
Toyohashi, Aichi
Toyohashi Air Raid
Toyohira, Hiroshima
Toyoka, Shizuoka
Toyokawa, Aichi
Toyokuni Fukuma
Toyokuni Shrine (Kanazawa)
Toyokuni Shrine (Kyoto)
Toyokuni Shrine (Nagoya)
Toyokuni Susumu
Toyomatsu, Hiroshima
Toyonaka, Kagawa
Toyonaka, Osaka
Toyone, Aichi
Toyono District, Osaka
Toyono, Kumamoto
Toyono, Osaka
Toyooka, Hyōgo
Toyooka, Shizuoka
Toyosaka, Hiroshima
Toyosaka, Niigata
Toyosato, Shiga
Toyota
Toyota Cavalier
Toyota Celica
Toyota Central R&D Labs., Inc.
Toyota District, Hiroshima
Toyota FTX
Toyota Highlander
Toyota Land Cruiser
Toyota Prius
Toyota Production System
Toyota Supra
Toyota, Aichi
Toyota, Yamaguchi
Toyotomi Hideyori
Toyotomi Hideyoshi
Toyotsu, Fukuoka
Toyoura District, Yamaguchi
Toyoura, Yamaguchi
Toyoyama, Aichi
Toyozo Arakawa
Tōzai Line (JR West)
Tōzai Line (Kobe)
Tōzai Line (Kyoto)

Tr
Transport in Japan
Tourism in Japan
Treasure (company)
Treasure of the Rudras
Treaty on Basic Relations between Japan and the Republic of Korea
Treaty of Portsmouth
Treaty of Saint Petersburg (1875)
Treaty of Shimonoseki
Triforce
Trigun
TRON (encoding)
TRON Project
Tropical cyclone
Trunks (Dragon Ball)

Ts
Tsu, Mie
Tsu (kana)
Tsu-11
Tsuba
Tsubame, Niigata
Tsubame (Shinkansen)
Tsubasa: Reservoir Chronicle
Tsubouchi Shoyo
Eiji Tsuburaya
Tsuchiura, Ibaraki
Masami Tsuchiya
Tsuchiyama, Shiga
Yukio Tsuda
Tsuga
Tsugaru, Aomori
Tsugaru Strait
Tsuge, Nara
Tsugu, Aichi
Tsugunai: Atonement
Tsuiki, Fukuoka
Jun Tsuji
Yuka Tsujiyoko
Tsukahara Bokuden
Shinya Tsukamoto
Tsukechi, Gifu
Tsukemono
Tsuki wa Higashi ni Hi wa Nishi ni: Operation Sanctuary
Tsukigase, Nara
Tsukihime
Tsukiji fish market
Tsukuba, Ibaraki
Tsukubo District, Okayama
Tsukude, Aichi
Tsukumi, Ōita
Tsuma, Shimane
Tsuna District, Hyōgo
Tsuna, Hyōgo
Tsunagi, Kumamoto
Tsunami
Ryosen Tsunashima
Tsuno, Miyazaki
Tsuru, Yamanashi
Tsuruda, Kagoshima
Tsuruga, Fukui
Tsurugashima, Saitama
Tsurugi (sword)
Tsurugi (train)
Tsurugi, Ishikawa
Tsurugi, Tokushima
Tsurumi, Ōita
Marutei Tsurunen
Tsuruoka, Yamagata
Tsuruoka Domain
Tsuruoka Station
Tsushima, Aichi
Tsushima, Ehime
Tsushima, Nagasaki
Tsushima Basin
Tsushima Fuchū Domain
Tsushima Island
Tsushima Maru
Tsushima Province
Tsushima Strait
Tsushima Subprefecture
Tsushima Yuko
Tsutsuga, Hiroshima
Tsuwano, Shimane
Tsuyama, Okayama
Tsuyazaki, Fukuoka
Tsuzuki District, Kyoto
Tsuzuki-ku, Yokohama

Tu
Turn A Gundam

Tv
TV Asahi
TV Osaka
TV Tokyo

Tw
Twenty-One Demands

Ty
Type 93 torpedo

T